The  is a tilting diesel multiple unit (DMU) train type operated by Hokkaido Railway Company (JR Hokkaido) on limited express services in Hokkaido, Japan, since 2000.

Design
The running gear was based on the KiHa 201 series trains introduced in 1997, and the body design was a joint venture with the Danish State Railways (DSB).

Fleet
, 35 KiHa 261 series vehicles were in operation. 14 were built by Fuji Heavy Industries, and 21 were built by JR Hokkaido. A further 28 vehicles are on order to be delivered from fiscal 2015.

Operations
KiHa 261 series trainsets are used on the following services.

KiHa 261-0 series 

KiHa 261-1000 series 

Formations

Sōya
Sōya services are normally formed of four-car KiHa 261-100 series sets, and are sometimes lengthened to six cars during busy periods.

4-car formations
Four-car sets are formed as follows.

6-car formations
Six-car sets are formed by adding two cars as shown below. Car 1 (and car 21) includes Green (first) class and standard class accommodation.

Super Tokachi

Super Tokachi services were originally formed of five-car KiHa 261-1000 series sets, but these were later reduced to four cars.

The 4-car Super Tokachi sets are formed as follows.

Interior

History

A four-car pre-production set was delivered from Fuji Heavy Industries in November 1998 for evaluation and testing.

A further 28 KiHa 261 series vehicles were delivered from 2015 onward, and these are not equipped with tilting capability.

From December 2015 until the end of 2017, the KiHa 261-1000 series fleet were gradually repainted into a new livery with white front ends, yellow front-end gangway doors, and a purple bodyside stripe.

KiHa 261-5000 series 
On 17 October 2019, JR Hokkaido announced plans to introduce two new KiHa 261-5000 series 5-car sets. They each feature external color schemes inspired by the hamanasu and lavender flowers, which, according to JR Hokkaido, are prominent throughout Hokkaido.

Car 1 is designated as a lounge car, featuring window-facing seats and transverse seating bays with tables. Cars 2 through 5 are ordinary-class cars, featuring 2+2 abreast seating throughout.

The "Hamanasu" set was built at Kawasaki Heavy Industries' Hyogo factory, and was delivered to JR Hokkaido in July 2020. It entered revenue service on 17 October of that year. The "Lavender" set was delivered from the same factory in January 2021 and entered revenue service in May of that year, although it was originally intended to enter service in April.

References

External links

 JR Hokkaido KiHa 261 Super Soya train information 
 JR Hokkaido KiHa 261/283 Super Tokachi train information 

261 series
Hokkaido Railway Company
Tilting trains
Train-related introductions in 2000
261
261